On 18 September 2009, a suicide car bombing killed at least 39 people in Usterzai, Pakistan.

At 11am on 18 September 2009, a suicide car bombing took place at Kacha Pakha bazaar village market at a busy intersection, badly damaging Hikmat Ali hotel, as well as a restaurant and shops, causing some to collapse. It happened in a Shia Muslim area of Usterzai, North-West Frontier Province, Pakistan, five and a half years after the war in northwest Pakistan began. The attack killed at least 39 people and injured another 54, most of whom are believed to have been members of Pakistan's Shia minority, who are often targeted by extremists among the majority Sunni Muslims.

A group calling itself Lahskar-e-Jhangvi al-Almi says it carried out the attack, in revenge for the killing of a prominent religious leader, Maulana M Amin, in Hangu, NWFP, three months earlier. They are believed to be linked to Taliban-linked Sunni supremacist group Lashkar-e-Jhangvi.

References

2009 murders in Pakistan
2000s building bombings
2000s crimes in Khyber Pakhtunkhwa
21st-century mass murder in Pakistan
Attacks on buildings and structures in 2009
Attacks on hotels in Asia
Attacks on restaurants in Asia
Attacks on shops
Building bombings in Khyber Pakhtunkhwa
Hotel bombings
Islamic terrorism in Pakistan
Islamic terrorist incidents in 2009
Kohat District
Lashkar-e-Jhangvi attacks
Marketplace attacks in Asia
September 2009 crimes
September 2009 events in Pakistan
Suicide bombings in 2009
Suicide bombings in Khyber Pakhtunkhwa
Suicide car and truck bombings in Pakistan
Terrorist incidents in Pakistan in 2009
Violence against Shia Muslims in Pakistan